Alpha is a village in Henry County, Illinois, United States. The population was 671 at the 2010 census, down from 726 in 2000.

History
On June 1, 1872, Anson Calkins laid out the village of Alpha. Alpha was created as a railroad town and replaced the town of Oxford, which was located about three miles west of current day Alpha. It was located at the junction between two lines of the Chicago, Burlington, and Quincy Railroad, and a since-razed depot was located at the junction. The north-south branch between Galesburg and Savanna crossed an east-west branch between Galva and New Boston. The east-west line has been abandoned and the north-south line is in operation as the BNSF Barstow Subdivision. The village was named Alpha (the first letter of the Greek alphabet), because Calkins believed it to be the beginnings of a great city. It was incorporated on January 11, 1895. In the early 1980s, director Barry Levinson looked at Alpha's railroad car diner as a possible location for filming scenes for his 1982 film Diner.

Geography
Alpha is located at  (41.192203, -90.380943).

Demographics

As of the census of 2000, there were 726 people, 305 households, and 216 families residing in the village. The racial makeup of the village was 98.48% White, 0.55% from other races, and 0.96% from two or more races. Hispanic or Latino of any race were 1.52% of the population.

There were 305 households, out of which 30.5% had children under the age of 18 living with them, 58.0% were married couples living together, 10.5% had a female householder with no husband present, and 28.9% were non-families. 25.6% of all households were made up of individuals, and 12.8% had someone living alone who was 65 years of age or older. The average household size was 2.38 and the average family size was 2.82.

In the village, the population was spread out, with 24.5% under the age of 18, 5.6% from 18 to 24, 28.2% from 25 to 44, 20.9% from 45 to 64, and 20.7% who were 65 years of age or older. The median age was 40 years. For every 100 females, there were 96.7 males. For every 100 females age 18 and over, there were 93.6 males.

The median income for a household in the village was $36,250, and the median income for a family was $43,750. Males had a median income of $31,548 versus $20,625 for females. The per capita income for the village was $17,407. About 4.2% of families and 5.8% of the population were below the poverty line, including 8.5% of those under age 18 and 6.8% of those age 65 or over.

References

External links
 Village profile

Villages in Henry County, Illinois
Villages in Illinois
Populated places established in 1872
1872 establishments in Illinois